Homalocephala is a genus of picture-winged flies in the family Ulidiidae.

Species
 Homalocephala albitarsis
 Homalocephala angustata
 Homalocephala apicalis (syn. H. similis)
 Homalocephala bimaculata
 Homalocephala biumbrata
 Homalocephala mamaevi
 Homalocephala ozerovi

References

Key to species of the genus Homalocephala

 
Tephritoidea genera